A referendum on retaining the monarchy or becoming a republic was held in Norway on 12 and 13 November 1905. Voters were asked whether they approved of the Storting's decision to authorise the government to make the offer of the throne of the newly self-ruling country. The Storting had wanted to offer the throne to Prince Carl of Denmark, but the prince insisted that the Norwegian people have a chance to decide whether they wanted to retain a monarchy. 

The proposal was approved by 78.9% of voters. Following the referendum, the Storting formally offered the throne to Carl on 18 November; Carl accepted, assuming the throne as King Haakon VII. The new royal family arrived in Norway on 25 November. King Haakon and Queen Maud were crowned in a ceremony in Nidaros Cathedral in Trondheim on 22 June 1906. Haakon became Norway's first separate monarch in 518 years.

Summary
On 7 June 1905, the Storting approved the dissolution of the union with Sweden; as a result, Swedish King Oscar II abdicated as King of Norway. He refused the reconciliation offer to allow a Swedish prince to take the Norwegian throne. 

The Storting thus turned to the Danish Prince Carl. In addition to the positive personal qualities, it was pointed out that he was Scandinavian and would understand the Norwegian language and culture.

He was the second son of Crown Prince Frederick and Louise of Sweden, the only surviving child of Oscar's older brother Charles XV and, before the birth of Oscar's sons, a serious contender as heir to the dissolved union. Frederick's brother had also been similarly invited to become a monarch of another nation as George I of Greece.

Carl's wife Princess Maud was Edward VII's daughter, so he had close ties to the United Kingdom and the British royal family, and an heir-apparent to the throne was already guaranteed through his son, the two-year-old Prince Alexander.

In Norway, it was debated whether the country should remain a monarchy or become a republic. Prince Carl demanded that the issue should be submitted to a referendum, as he wanted an assurance that a majority of the population wanted Norway to remain as a monarchy.

The question posed was:

A majority voted in favour of monarchy, and on 18 November the Parliament formally elected Prince Carl as king. The Speaker of Parliament sent him a telegram offering him the throne of Norway.

The prince accepted the election, and on 25 November 1905 the new Norwegian royal family landed at Vippetangen in Christiania (Oslo). He took the name Haakon and gave his son Alexander  the name Olav, names that linked the new royal house to the Norwegian kings from the Middle Ages. Specifically Haakon VI and Olaf IV were the last monarchs before the Kalmar Union. On 22 June 1906, King Haakon VII and Queen Maud were crowned in Nidaros Cathedral in Trondheim.

Results

See also
Dissolution of the union between Norway and Sweden
1905 Norwegian union dissolution referendum

References

Further reading
Bomann-Larsen, Tor (2006) Haakon og Maud III/Vintertronen (Oslo: Cappelen)

External links
Referendum - Prins Carl of Denmark for King of Norway

Political history of Norway
Referendums in Norway
1905 referendums
1905 in Norway
Norwegian monarchy
Republicanism in Norway
Monarchy referendums
November 1905 events